The 2013 European Rowing Championships was held in Seville, Spain, between 31 May and 2 June 2013.

Medal summary

Men

Women

Medal table

External links 
 

European Rowing Championships
European Rowing Championships
International sports competitions hosted by Spain
European Rowing Championships
Rowing Championships
Rowing competitions in Spain
Sports competitions in Seville
21st century in Seville